Richard Francis Mckiniry (March 23, 1878 – May 30, 1950) was an American lawyer and politician who served one term as a U.S. Representative from New York from 1919 to 1921.

Biography 
Born in New York City, Mckiniry attended the public schools.
He graduated from the College of St. Francis Xavier, New York City, and from the New York Law School.
He was admitted to the bar in 1899 and commenced the practice of his profession in New York City.

He served as assistant District Attorney of Bronx County 1914–1917.
Secretary of the State supreme court, first district from 1917 to 1919.

Congress 
Mckiniry was elected as a Democrat to the Sixty-sixth Congress (March 4, 1919 – March 3, 1921).
He was an unsuccessful candidate for reelection in 1920 to the Sixty-seventh Congress.

Later career and death 
He was appointed a magistrate of New York City on January 1, 1923, and served until August 15, 1943, when he retired due to ill health.

He died in Yonkers, New York, May 30, 1950.
He was interred in Calvary Cemetery, Long Island City, New York.

Sources

1878 births
1950 deaths
New York Law School alumni
American Roman Catholics
Burials at Calvary Cemetery (Queens)
Democratic Party members of the United States House of Representatives from New York (state)
New York (state) state court judges